Kongshavn or Kongshamn is a village in the municipality of Arendal in Agder county, Norway. Its population (2009) was 862. Kongshavn is located on the north side of the island of Tromøya, across the Tromøysundet strait from the village of Eydehavn.

Name
It is said that Kongshamn was a safe haven for the king's ships during the Viking Age. Kongshavn is a Norwegian language word meaning "King's Landing" or "King's Port".

References

Villages in Agder
Arendal